PIPC may refer to:
 Palisades Interstate Park Commission, a governing body for Palisades Interstate Park
 Pengerang Integrated Petroleum Complex, a development project in Malaysia
 Personal Information Protection Commission (South Korea), a national data protection authority in South Korea